Abakrampa is a town in the Central Region of Ghana. It is popularly called 'ABK'. Abakrampa is the seat of the Abura Omanhene of Abura traditional council. The town is also known for the Abakrampa Secondary Technical School School and its festival called 'Tutu Apon' meaning the conqueror of the great.  The school is a second cycle institution.

References

Populated places in the Central Region (Ghana)